Cartoon Storybook is a Canadian children's television series which aired on CBC Television in 1959.

Premise
European animated films were the focus of this series hosted by Ross Snetsinger and Foster, his hand puppet.

Scheduling
This 15-minute series was broadcast on Tuesdays at 4:45 p.m. (Eastern) from 7 April to 23 June 1959 with a final episode on 30 June 1959 at 5:15 p.m..

External links
 

CBC Television original programming
1950s Canadian children's television series
1959 Canadian television series debuts
1959 Canadian television series endings
Black-and-white Canadian television shows
Canadian television series with live action and animation
Canadian television shows featuring puppetry